Official Museums of Amsterdam (OAM) is a consulting association of museums in Amsterdam. The organisation has existed since the eighties but it was formally founded in 1994. The organization contains both private and public museums, all of which are registered as members of De Museumvereniging, the Dutch Museum Association.

The OAM association has a limited jurisdiction and an elected chair and vice-chair.

The 'official' museums of Amsterdam actually do not exist. The name is a misleading translation of the unofficial name of an unincorporated meeting club of mostly government subsidized museums who co-ordinate their marketing to monopolize further government subsidies for city marketing and government assistance. The website of the Jewish Historical Museum slightly more correctly calls them: 'organization' of Amsterdam Museums with an office in the Amsterdam Uitburo or the city's entertainment desk. But the real Dutch name, as in the logo, is 'overleg' or 'meeting.'

The foundation Samenwerkende Amsterdamse Musea (SAM) represents the collective business interests of the OAM. Bjorn Stenvers was founding director of SAM from 2012 to 2017. In 2015 he founded the Amsterdam Museum Academy for museum staff trainings.
 
The Marketing Overleg der Amsterdamse Musea (MOAM) represents the collective marketing interests of the OAM. All of the heads of marketing and communication of the forty-four partner museums are involved in MOAM. They each act as consultants, contractors, and advisers for the partner museums. The Museum Night (Dutch: Museumnacht, N8) was initiated by the MOAM, but has now become an independent organisation.

Members
The current list of the 44 members:

References

External links
Amsterdam Museums, official website

Museums in Amsterdam
Museum organizations